Saint John's High School is a private Catholic boys' high school located in Shrewsbury, Massachusetts. It is located in the Roman Catholic Diocese of Worcester. The school was founded and is currently sponsored by the Xaverian Brothers.

History
The Xaverian Brothers' association with Worcester dates back to September 1893, when a pioneer community of four Xaverians arrived in the city to formally open Saint John's Parish Grammar School for Boys. In 1898 a three-year high school curriculum was introduced. A fourth, or senior year, was added in 1906, when the College of the Holy Cross dropped that institution's college prep or high school senior course to concentrate solely on college-level work.

In November 1953, John Cardinal Wright, who was then Bishop of Worcester, transferred the high school property under the new title of Saint John's Preparatory School of Worcester to the Xaverian Brothers. This event coincided with the centennial celebration of the Brothers' arrival in America in 1854. The school population in 1954 consisted of eleven Brothers and 354 students. The brothers purchased a large acre estate in neighboring Shrewsbury. This acquisition was the first step in the expansion of Saint John's to a regional high school serving all of Worcester County. In 1959, one hundred twenty-five acres at the foot of Main Street hill were purchased, and Pioneer Field came into being. In 1962, all classes had transferred to the Shrewsbury location. A gym and cafeteria were added in 1963 and 1964.

From an enrollment of slightly over 410 and a staff consisting of four Brothers, Saint John's has emerged during the last ten decades as a regional, private, catholic, college-preparatory school with a student body of nearly 900. After the January 2008 retirement of Brother Plunket Doherty, there are no longer any Xaverian Brothers on the faculty, which is now composed solely of lay men and women.

Controversy
In July 2019, a report compiled by a former FBI agent accused 6 former Xaverian Brothers of sexually abusing underage school children.

In a letter to the St. John's community, Mr. Zequeira and Mr. Creed wrote: "Please know that we prize, above all else, the trust you have placed in us to educate and protect your sons."

Athletics
St. John's has 16 varsity men's sports. In the fall, they compete in football, soccer, golf, and cross country. They also have a club rowing team in the fall. In the winter, they compete in swimming, basketball, wrestling, alpine ski, and indoor track and field. In the spring, they compete in rowing, lacrosse, baseball, and outdoor track and field.

St. John's has had several alumni play professionally in the National Football League, National Hockey League, and Major League Baseball.

Notable alumni

Politics
 Edward M. Augustus Jr. (1983)- Worcester City Manager 2014–Present
 Matthew Beaton (1996) - Massachusetts Secretary of Energy and Environmental Affairs
 Peter Blute (1974) – former member of the United States Congress
 John A. Durkin (1954) - former United States Senator from New Hampshire
 Joseph Early (1951) – former member of the United States Congress
 Dan Grabauskas (1981) - CEO of the Honolulu Authority for Rapid Transportation
 Steve Kerrigan - candidate for Lt. Governor of Massachusetts, 2012 CEO of Democratic National Convention, 2013 CEO of Presidential Inaugural Committee
 Tim Murray (1986) – former Lieutenant Governor of Massachusetts

Business
 John F. Smith Jr. (1956) – former CEO/Chairman General Motors

Media/arts
 Mike Birbiglia (attended for one year) – comedian, actor, and NPR contributor; wrote about his freshman year at St. John's in his book Sleepwalk With Me: and Other Painfully True Stories
 John Dufresne (1965) – author and university professor; winner of a Guggenheim Fellowship
 Jim Ford (2000) – Film and television actor, stuntman, screenwriter and film director; stunt double for Edward Norton
 Brett Murphy (2010) – child actor in Fever Pitch and Pulitzer Prize finalist journalist
 Frank O'Hara (1943) – Museum of Modern Art curator; Poet, Meditations in an Emergency, which was featured in Mad Men (there is an episode in season 2 of the television series Mad Men named after the book)
 Andrew J. Olmsted (1988) – U.S. Army major and Iraq War correspondent
 Charlie Pierce (1971) – lead political blogger for Esquire; sportswriter and columnist for the Boston Globe, the New York Times, the Los Angeles Times, the Chicago Tribune, GQ, Sports Illustrated, and formerly ESPN's Grantland; regular contributor to NPR programs Wait Wait...Don't Tell Me! and formerly Only A Game
 Michael Ritchie (1975) – Artistic Director, Los Angeles Center Theatre Group

Athletics

Football
 John Andreoli (1978) - played for USFL Boston/New Orleans Breakers
 Rob Blanchflower (2009) - tight end for Pittsburgh Steelers, 2014–15
 Richard Rodgers II (2011) - tight end for the Los Angeles Chargers with 15 career touchdowns in the NFL. On December 3, 2015, Rodgers caught the longest game-winning, game-ending Hail Mary in NFL history, according to the Elias Sports Bureau.

Basketball
 Rob Hennigan (2000) - Vice President of Basketball Operations for the Oklahoma City Thunder, former General Manager for the Orlando Magic 2012-17
 Tom Moore (1983) – Quinnipiac University head men's basketball coach, 2007–17

Baseball
 Brian Abraham - Director, Minor League Operations for the Boston Red Sox; bullpen catcher for the 2013 World Series champion Boston Red Sox
 John Andreoli (2008) - former outfielder for the San Diego Padres, Seattle Mariners, and Baltimore Orioles
 Pat Bourque (1965) – former first baseman for the Oakland Athletics, Chicago Cubs, and Minnesota Twins; 1973 World Series champion
 Ron Darling (1978) – broadcaster; former MLB All-Star pitcher for the New York Mets, Montreal Expos, and Oakland Athletics; Gold Glove winner, 1986 World Series champion, and inductee in the New York Mets Hall of Fame
 Tim Lahey (2000) – Phantom ballplayer, was on the Philadelphia Phillies active roster, but never appeared in a game
 Ryan O'Rourke (2006) - former pitcher for the Minnesota Twins and New York Mets
 Lance Zawadzki (2003) – former shortstop for the San Diego Padres; hitting coach for the Double-A Portland Sea Dogs

Golf
 Fran Quinn (1983) - PGA golfer with 8 professional wins

Hockey
 Jim Stewart (1974) - former goaltender for the Boston Bruins

Notable faculty
 Fred Borchelt, former Olympic rower, silver medalist at the 1984 Summer Olympics

References

External links
 School website

Boys' schools in Massachusetts
Catholic secondary schools in Massachusetts
Schools sponsored by the Xaverian Brothers
Buildings and structures in Shrewsbury, Massachusetts
Educational institutions established in 1894
Catholic Conference (MIAA)
1894 establishments in Massachusetts